Nicole Maria Burdette (born December 24, 1963) is an American playwright and actress. She is also an assistant professor at The New School for Drama.

Early life and education
Burdette was born in San Francisco, the first of two children of Ellen (née Stepovich) and Lawrence Burdette. Her uncle is former governor of Alaska, Mike Stepovich whose daughter, Nada, is married to NBA player John Stockton.

She attended New York University with a triple major in acting, writing and the humanities. She graduated with honors and was a recipient of the prestigious Founders' Day Award.

Career
In 1986, she co-founded the theater company Naked Angels, which she named. The Naked Angels Theater Company produced many of her plays including The Bluebird Special Came Through Here, directed by Rebecca Miller, I'd Rather Be Punch Drunk (which she starred in as well), BUSTED (with Ashley Judd in her first stage role) which was on a double bill with the original one act of what was to become Lobby Hero by Kenneth Lonergan produced in conjunction with The John Drew Theater in East Hampton and Chelsea Walls, directed by Tony Award-winning Edwin Sherin.

Chelsea Walls was originally workshopped and performed for a one night staged reading with Matt Dillon, Rob Morrow, Nancy Travis and many others at The Minetta Lane Theatre, directed by Roxanne Rogers (sister of Sam Shepard). And in 1998 a star studded benefit reading of the play for the theater company was produced at The New Victory Theater on Broadway, directed by film director Alexandre Rockwell and a cast that included Rufus Sewell, Ethan Hawke, John Heard, Kathryn Erbe, Mary Stuart Masterson, Josh Hamilton, Jesse L. Martin, Kevin Corrigan and others. She acted in many productions with Naked Angels as well, including starring in Kenneth Lonergan's A Suffering Colonel. Burdette also was involved as both an actor and playwright with Malaparte who produced her play The Great Unwashed, starring Ethan Hawke, Frank Whaley, Robert Sean Leonard and Martha Plimpton.

Her first film role was in 1987's Angel Heart. Her first major role was opposite Brad Pitt in Robert Redford's A River Runs Through It. She had acted with Pitt previously in the film Johnny Suede; the scene was subsequently cut from the film. She portrayed Barbara Soprano on the HBO television series The Sopranos from 2000 to 2001. She received the Best Screenplay Award at the 2001 Newport Beach Film Festival for Maze. She adapted her play Chelsea Walls into a feature film directed by Ethan Hawke, which premiered at the 2001 Cannes Film Festival.

She has written for magazines such as Bomb (where she was a contributing editor for many years), Interview, and Harper's Bazaar, for which she interviewed Redford in 1992. A piece of hers was commissioned and appeared in ANTHOLOGY: A MEMORY, A MONOLOGUE, A RANT AND A PRAYER, a collection which included pieces from Lynn Nottage, Michael Cunningham, Susan Minot and many others.

She teaches playwriting and screenwriting at The New School for Drama. She has also taught several classes at both Columbia University's English Department and Columbia University's Film School, including the course she created, "Lou and You" about Lou Reed's intellectual and academic journey toward becoming a songwriter and musician.

Burdette was nominated for the 2018 Rome Prize.

Writing credits

Stage

Film

Acting credits

Film
In A River Runs Through It (1992) Burdette plays Mabel, Paul Maclean’s (Brad Pitt) girlfriend

Television

References

External links
 

1963 births
Living people
American women dramatists and playwrights
The New School faculty
Writers from San Francisco
Actresses from San Francisco
American women academics
New York University alumni
Academics from California
20th-century American women writers
21st-century American women writers